See also History of Unitarianism
A number of notable people have considered themselves Unitarians, Universalists, and following the merger of these denominations in the United States and Canada in 1961, Unitarian Universalists. Additionally, there are persons who, because of their writings or reputation, are considered to have held Unitarian or Universalist beliefs. Individuals who held unitarian (nontrinitarian) beliefs but were not affiliated with Unitarian organizations are often referred to as "small 'u unitarians. The same principle can be applied to those who believed in universal salvation but were not members of Universalist organizations. This article, therefore, makes the distinction between capitalized "Unitarians" and "Universalists" and lowercase "unitarians" and "universalists".

The Unitarians and Universalists are groups that existed long before the creation of Unitarian Universalism.

Early Unitarians did not hold Universalist beliefs, and early Universalists did not hold Unitarian beliefs. But beginning in the nineteenth century the theologies of the two groups started becoming more similar.

Additionally, their eventual merger as the Unitarian Universalist Association (UUA) did not eliminate divergent Unitarian and Universalist congregations, especially outside the US. Even within the US, some congregations still keep only one of the two names, "Unitarian" or "Universalist". However, with only a few exceptions, all belong to the UUA—even those that maintain dual affiliation (e.g., Unitarian and Quaker). Transcendentalism was a movement that diverged from contemporary American Unitarianism but has been embraced by later Unitarians and Unitarian Universalists.

In Northern Ireland, Unitarian churches are officially called "Non-Subscribing Presbyterian", but are informally known as "Unitarian" and are affiliated with the Unitarian churches of the rest of the world.

A
 Francis Ellingwood Abbot (1836–1903) – Unitarian minister who led a group that attempted to liberalize the Unitarian constitution and preamble. He later helped found the Free Religious Association.
 Abigail Adams (1744–1818) – women's rights advocate and first Second Lady and the second First Lady of the United States
 James Luther Adams (1901–1994) – Unitarian theologian.
 John Adams (1735–1826) – second President of the United States.
 John Quincy Adams (1767–1848) – sixth President of the United States. Co-founder, All Souls Church, Unitarian (Washington, D.C.)
 Sarah Fuller Adams (1805–1848) – English poet and hymn writer
 Conrad Aiken (1889–1973) – poet
 Louisa May Alcott (1832–1888) – author of Little Women.
 Ethan Allen (1738–1789) – author of Reason the Only Oracle of Man, and the chief source of Hosea Ballou's universalist ideas
 Joseph Henry Allen (1820–1898) – American Unitarian scholar and minister
 Arthur J. Altmeyer (1891–1972) – father of Social Security
 Oliver Ames, Jr. (1807–1877) – Massachusetts businessman and industrialist who commissioned the building of the Unity Church of North Easton
 J. M. Andrews (1871–1956) – Prime Minister of Northern Ireland (a Non-subscribing Presbyterian member)
 Thomas Andrews (1873-1912) – Master-shipbuilder of the RMS Oceanic (1899), "Big Four", and Olympic-class ocean liners (a Non-subscribing Presbyterian member)
 Tom Andrews (born 1953) – U.S. Representative from Maine
 Susan B. Anthony (1820–1906) – Quaker
 Robert Aspland (1782–1845) – English Unitarian minister, editor and activist, founder of the British and Foreign Unitarian Association
Francis (Frank) X. Arvan (1955-) – Architect, Writer, Musician
 Robert Brook Aspland (1805–1869) – English Unitarian minister and editor, son of Robert Aspland

B
 Samuel Bache (1804-1876) - English Unitarian minister
 E. Burdette Backus (1888–1955) – Unitarian Humanist minister (originally a Universalist)
 Bill Baird (born 1932) – abortion rights pioneer, Unitarian.
 Sara Josephine Baker (1873–1945) – physician and public health worker.
 Emily Greene Balch (1867–1961) – Nobel Peace Laureate
 Roger Nash Baldwin (1884–1981) – founder of American Civil Liberties Union
 Adin Ballou (1803–1890) – abolitionist and former Baptist who became a Universalist minister, then a Unitarian minister.
 Hosea Ballou (1771–1852) – American Universalist leader. (Universalist minister and a unitarian in theology)
 Aaron Bancroft (1755–1839) – Congregationalist Unitarian minister
 John Bardeen (1908–1991) – physicist, Nobel Laureate 1956 (inventing the transistor) and in 1972 (superconductivity)
 Phineas Taylor Barnum (1810–1891) – American showman and Circus Owner
 Ysaye Maria Barnwell (born 1946) – member of Sweet Honey in the Rock, founded the Jubilee Singers, a choir at All Souls Church in Washington, D.C.
 Béla Bartók (1881–1945) – composer.
 Clara Barton (1821–1912) – organizer of American Red Cross, Universalist
 Clara Bancroft Beatley (1858-1923) – educator, lecturer, author
 Christopher C. Bell (born 1933) – author
 Ami Bera (born 1965) – U.S. Representative for California
 Henry Bergh (1811–1888) – founded the American Society for the Prevention of Cruelty to Animals and the Society for the Prevention of Cruelty to Children.
 Tim Berners-Lee (born 1955) – inventor of the World Wide Web.
 Paul Blanshard (1892–1980) – activist.
 Joani Blank (1937–2016) – sexuality educator and co-housing activist.
 Chester Bliss Bowles (1901–1986) – Connecticut Governor and diplomat.
 Ray Bradbury (1920–2012) – author.
 Andre Braugher (born 1962) - American actor
 T. Berry Brazelton (1918-2018) – pediatrician, author, TV show host.
 Alice Williams Brotherton (1848-1930), poet and magazine writer 
 Olympia Brown (1835–1926) – suffragist, Universalist minister of the Unitarian Universalist Church of Kent Ohio
 Percival Brundage (1892–1979) – technocrat
 John A. Buehrens (born 1947) – president of the Unitarian Universalist Association from 1993–2001
 Charles Bulfinch (1763–1844) – most notable for being Architect of the Capitol. Co-founder, All Souls Church, Unitarian (Washington, D.C.)
 Ralph Wendell Burhoe (1911–1997) – scholar
 Harold Hitz Burton (1888–1964) – U.S. Supreme Court Justice 1945–1958
 Edmund Butcher (1757–1822) – English minister

C
 John C. Calhoun (1782–1850) – U.S. Vice President and Senator Co-founder, All Souls Church, Unitarian (Washington, D.C.)
 Walter Bradford Cannon (1871–1945) – experimental physiologist
 Louise Whitfield Carnegie (1857–1946) – wife of philanthropist Andrew Carnegie. After Carnegie died Louise made donations to charities.
 Lant Carpenter (1780–1840) – English Unitarian minister, author and educator
 Russell Lant Carpenter (1816–1892) – Unitarian minister. Son and biographer of Dr. Lant Carpenter
 William Herbert Carruth (1859-1924) – educator, poet, President of Pacific Coast Conference of the Unitarian Church
 Samuel Carter (1805–1878) – British MP and early railway solicitor
 Lee Carter (born 1987) — delegate for Virginia's 50th House of Delegates district (according to his campaign website, he and his family attend their local Unitarian Universalist Church)
 Joseph Chamberlain (1836–1914) – Manufacturer, Unitarian, founder of local government in Britain.
 Neville Chamberlain (1869–1940) – Unitarian, then an agnostic and, British Prime Minister.
 Augusta Jane Chapin (1836–1905) – American Universalist minister, educator and activist for women's rights
 William Ellery Channing (1780–1842) – Unitarian minister, whose 1819 sermon "Unitarian Christianity" laid the foundations for American Unitarianism.
 Charles Chauncy (1592–1672) – Unitarian Congregationalist minister.
 Jesse Chickering (1797–1855) – Unitarian minister and economist
 Brock Chisholm (1896–1971) – director, World Health Organization
 Parley P. Christensen (1869–1954) – Utah and California politician, Esperantist
 Judy Chu (born 1953) - Congressperson representing California's 27th Congressional District. First Chinese-American woman elected to the U.S. Congress
 Annie Clark (born 1982) – musician and singer-songwriter, better known by her stage name, St. Vincent (musician). 
 Andrew Inglis Clark (1848–1907) – Tasmanian politician. Responsible for the adoption of the Hare-Clark system of proportional representation by the Parliament of Tasmania
 Grenville Clark (1882–1931) – author
 Joseph S. Clark (1901–1990) – U.S. Senator and mayor of Philadelphia
 Laurel Clark (1961–2003) – U.S. Navy officer and NASA Astronaut who died in the Space Shuttle Columbia disaster
 James Freeman Clarke (1810–1888) – Unitarian minister, theologian and author
 Stanley Cobb (1887–1968) – neurologist and psychiatrist
 William Cohen (born 1940) – U.S. Secretary of Defense (1997–2001), U.S. Senator from Maine (1979–1997)
 Emily Parmely Collins (1814–1909) — American suffragist, activist, writer
 Henry Steele Commager (1902–1998) – American historian and biographer of Theodore Parker
 Kent Conrad (born 1948) – U.S. Senator from North Dakota (1992–2013)
 Maria Cook (1779–1835) – first woman to be recognized as a Universalist preacher.
 William David Coolidge (1873–1975) – inventor, physician, research director
 Peter Cooper (1791-1883) - industrialist, inventor, philanthropist, and politician; founder of The Cooper Union.
 Norman Cousins (1915–1990) – editor and writer, Unitarian friend
* E. E. Cummings (1894–1962) – poet and painter
 William Cushing (1732–1810) – one of the original US Supreme Court Justices, appointed by Geo. Washington and longest serving of the original justices (1789–1810).

D
 Cyrus Dallin (1861–1944) – American sculptor
 Charles Darwin (1809–1882) – English naturalist and biologist
 Ferenc Dávid (born as Franz David Hertel, often rendered as Francis David or Francis Davidis) (1510–1579) – Transylvanian priest, minister and bishop, founder of the Unitarian Church of Transylvania, first to use the word "Unitarian" to describe his faith
 George de Benneville (1703–1793) – Universalist
 Morris Dees (born 1936) – attorney, cofounder, chief legal counsel of Southern Poverty Law Center
 Karl W. Deutsch (1912–1992) – international political scientist
 John Dewey (1859–1952) – author of A Common Faith, Unitarian friend
 Charles Dickens (1812–1870) – English novelist.
 Dorothea Dix (1802-1887) – prison reformer in New England.
 John H. Dietrich (1878–1957) – Unitarian minister
 James Drummond Dole (1877–1958) – entrepreneur
 Emily Taft Douglas (1899–1994) – U.S. Representative, Illinois
 Paul Douglas (1892–1976) – U.S. Senator, also a Quaker
 Madelyn Dunham (1922–2008) – grandmother of U.S. President Barack Obama
 Stanley Armour Dunham (1918–1992) – grandfather of Barack Obama
 Stanley Ann Dunham (1942–1995) – mother of Barack Obama

E
 Richard Eddy (1828–1906) – minister and author of 1886 book Universalism in America.
 James Chuter Ede (1882-1965) - British teacher, trade unionist and politician, Home Secretary (1945-1951) and President of the General Assembly of Unitarian and Free Christian Churches
 Charles William Eliot (1834–1926) – landscape architect
 Samuel Atkins Eliot (1862–1950) – first president of the Unitarians
 Thomas H. Eliot (1907–1991) – legislator and educator
 Thomas Lamb Eliot (1841–1936) – minister, founder of First Unitarian Church in Portland, Oregon, and Reed College
 Ralph Waldo Emerson (1803–1882) – Unitarian minister and Transcendentalist
 William Emerson (1873 – 1957) – MIT dean of architecture
 Ephraim Emerton (1851–1935) – historian and educator
 Marc Estrin (born 1939) – American novelist and political activist
 Charles Carroll Everett (1829–1900) – Unitarian minister and Harvard Divinity professor from Maine
 Charles Wesley Emerson (1837-1908) – Unitarian minister and founder of Emerson College

F
 Sophia Lyon Fahs (1876–1978) – liberal religious educator
 Millard Fillmore (1800–1874) – thirteenth President of the United States
 Joseph L. Fisher (1914–1992) – U.S. congressman
 Hermann van Flekwyk (d. 1569) - Dutch anabaptist
 Benjamin Flower (1755–1829) – English radical writer
 James Freeman (1759–1835) – first American preacher to call himself a Unitarian
 Caleb Fleming (1698–1779) – English anti-Trinitarian dissenting minister
 Robert Fulghum (born 1937) – UU minister and writer
 Buckminster Fuller (1895–1983) – inventor, engineer
 Margaret Fuller (1810–1850) – journalist
 János Füzi (1776-1833) - unitarian minister, teacher

G
 Elizabeth Gaskell (1810–1865) – British novelist and social reformer
 Frank Gannett (1876–1957) – newspaper publisher
 Greta Gerwig (born 1983) – actor
 Thomas Field Gibson (1803–1889) – English manufacturer who aided the welfare of the Spitalfields silk weavers
 Henry Giles (1809–1882) – British-American Unitarian minister and writer
 Hilary Goodridge – the lead plaintiff in the landmark case Goodridge v. Department of Public Health
 Eleanor Gordon (1852–1942) – minister and member of the Iowa Sisterhood.
 Mike Gravel (1930–2021) – U.S. Senator; 2008 Democratic presidential candidate
 Mary H. Graves (1839–1908) – minister, literary editor, writer
 Dana Greeley (1908–1986) – the first president of the Unitarian Universalist Association
 Horace Greeley (1811–1872) – newspaper editor, presidential candidate, Universalist
 Robert Joseph Greene (born 1973) – Canadian author and LGBT Activist
 Chester Greenwood (1858–1937) – inventor
 Gary Gygax (1938–2008) – game designer and creator of Dungeons and Dragons, called himself a Christian, "albeit one that is of the Arian (Unitarian) persuasion."

H
 Edward Everett Hale (1822–1909) – American author, historian and Unitarian clergyman.
 Ellen L. Hamilton (1921–1996) – artist, author, advocate for homeless teens, and member of UUA Board of Trustees (1973–1977).
 Phebe Ann Coffin Hannaford (1829–1921) – first lesbian minister, biographer
 Frances Harper (1825–1911) – abolitionist, suffragist, poet, teacher, public speaker, and writer; one of the first African-American women to be published in the United States. Unitarian.
 Donald S. Harrington (1914–2005)
 Charles Hartshorne (1897–2000) – theologian, who developed Process Theology
 John Hayward – philosopher of religion and the arts
 William Hazlitt (1737–1820) – influential Unitarian minister and father of the writer of the same name
 Oliver Heaviside (1850–1925) – self-taught English electrical engineer, mathematician, and physicist
 Iacob Heraclid (1527–1563) – Greek Maltese adventurer, missionary, Prince of Moldavia
 Thomas Wentworth Higginson (1823–1911) – Unitarian Minister and member of the Secret Six who funded John Brown's raid on Harper's Ferry.
 Lotta Hitschmanova (1909–1990) – founder, Unitarian Service Committee of Canada
 Jessica Holmes (born 1973) – cast member of Air Farce.
 John Holmes (1904–1962) – poet
 Oliver Wendell Holmes, Jr. (1841–1935) – American jurist who served as an Associate Justice of the Supreme Court of the United States from 1902 to 1932. Unitarian
 W. R. Holway (1893–1981) – engineer in Tulsa, co-founded All Souls Unitarian Church in 1921.
 Julia Ward Howe (1819–1910) – author of "The Battle Hymn of the Republic".
 Roman Hruska (1904–1999) – conservative Republican Senator from Nebraska
 David Hubel (1926-2013) – Nobel Prize Laureate in Medicine 1981
 Charles Hudson (1795–1881) – Universalist minister and politician
 Harm Jan Huidekoper (1776-1854) – businessman, essayist and lay theologian, a vice president of the American Unitarian Association, and co-founder of the Meadville Theological School
 Michelle Huneven (born August 14, 1953) is an American novelist and journalist.  She attends Neighborhood Unitarian Universalist Church in Pasadena CA.
 Blake Hutchison (born 1980) – filmmaker, Finding a Dream

J
 Thomas Jefferson (1743–1826) – third president of the U.S., unitarian but not affiliated with any sect
 Joseph Johnson (1738–1809) – English publisher
 Jenkin Lloyd Jones (1843–1918) – Unitarian missionary and minister in the United States
 Richard Lloyd Jones (1873–1963) – son of Jenkin Lloyd Jones, editor and publisher of the Tulsa Tribune, also co-founder of All Souls Unitarian Church in 1921.
 Rev. Joseph Fletcher Jordan (1842-1901) – first African American Universalist minister
 Annie Bizzell Jordan Willis (1893 - 1977) – daughter of Rev. Joseph Fletcher Jordan, a religious educator and integrationist

K
 György Kepes (1906–2001) – visual artist
 Naomi King (born 1970) – Unitarian minister, daughter of author Stephen King
 Thomas Starr King (1824–1864) – minister who during his career served both in Universalist and in Unitarian churches. Namesake of Starr King School.
 James R. Killian (1904–1988) – president of the Massachusetts Institute of Technology
 W.M. Kiplinger (1891–1967) – publisher of the Kiplinger Letters
 Webster Kitchell (1931-2009) - theologian 
 Abner Kneeland (1774–1844) – Universalist minister and denominational leader who, after leaving the denomination to become a leader in the freethought movement, was convicted and jailed for blasphemy.
 Richard Knight (1768–1844) – friend, colleague and follower of Joseph Priestley, developed the first method to make platinum malleable. Stored Priestley's library during his escape to America.
 Penney Kome (born 1948) - Canadian author and journalist

L
 William L. Langer (1896–1977) – historian of diplomacy
 Margaret Laurence (1926–1987) – author
 Alfred McClung Lee (1906–1992) – sociologist
 John Lewis (philosopher) (1889–1976) – British Unitarian minister and Marxist philosopher and author of many works on philosophy, anthropology, and religion.
 Arthur Lismer (1885–1969) – Canadian painter, educator
 Viola Liuzzo (1925–1965) – civil rights activist
 Mary Livermore (1820–1905) – Universalist
 James W. Loewen (born 1942) – sociologist
 Arthur Lovejoy (1873–1962) – founder of the History of Ideas movement

M
 John P. Marquand (1893–1960) – author
 Peter Finch Martineau (1755–1847) – English businessman and community benefactor 
 Charlotte Garrigue Masaryk(ová) (1850–1923) – wife of first President of Czechoslovakia Tomáš Garrigue Masaryk
 Tomáš Garrigue Masaryk (1850–1937) – first President of Czechoslovakia
 Bernard Maybeck (1862–1957) – architect, Unitarian
 Scotty McLennan (born 1948) – dean for Religious Life at Stanford University, Minister of Stanford Memorial Church, and inspiration for the Reverend Scot Sloan character in the comic strip Doonesbury
 Adrian Melott (born 1947) – physicist and cosmologist
 Herman Melville (1819–1891) – American writer best known for Moby-Dick.
 Samuel Freeman Miller (1816–1890) – United States Supreme Court Justice from 1862 to 1890
 Robert Millikan (1868–1953) – Nobel Laureate in Physics 1923 for determining the charge of the electron, taught at Caltech in Pasadena CA
 Walt Minnick (born 1942) – Politician and representative for Idaho's 1st congressional district, United States House of Representatives
 Théodore Monod (1902–2000) – French activist. Founding president of the Francophone Unitarian Association
 Ashley Montagu (1905–1999) – anthropologist and social biologist
 Slim Moon (born 1967) - American music producer
 Christopher Moore – founder of the Chicago Children's Choir
 Mary Carr Moore (1873–1957) – composer, teacher, Far Western activist for American Music
 Peter Morales – eighth president of the Unitarian Universalist Association
 Arthur E. Morgan (1878–1975) – human engineer and college president
 John Murray (1741–1815) – Universalist minister and leader
 Judith Sargent Murray (1751–1820) – American writer, held a local Universalist preacher's license in the 1790s, an advocate of Universalism and women's rights

N
 Isaac Newton (1642-1726) – English physicist and mathematician
 Maurine Neuberger (1907–2000) – U.S. Senator
 Paul Newman (1925–2008) – actor, film director
 Andrews Norton (1786-1853) – Once known as the “Unitarian Pope”
 Joseph Nye (1937-Present) Rhodes Scholar, Former Dean of the John F. Kennedy School of Government at Harvard University, and one of the most influential figures in American foreign policy history by Foreign Policy Magazine

O
 Keith Olbermann (born 1959) – news anchor, political commentator, and sports journalist
 Mary White Ovington (1865–1951) – NAACP founder

P
 Bob Packwood (born 1932) – U.S. Senator from Oregon (1969–1995)
 John Palmer (1742–1786) – English Unitarian minister
 David Park (1911–1960) – West coast painter.
 Isaac Parker (1768–1830) – Massachusetts Congressman and jurist, including Chief Justice of the Massachusetts Supreme Judicial Court from 1814 to his death.
 Theodore Parker (1810–1860) – Unitarian minister and transcendentalist
 Linus Pauling (1901–1994) – Nobel Laureate for Peace and for Chemistry
 Randy Pausch (1960–2008) – computer science professor at Carnegie Mellon University, Author of The Last Lecture
 Cecilia Payne-Gaposchkin (1900–1979) – astronomer and astrophysicist.
 Richard Peacock (1820–1889) – British locomotive engineer and philanthropist
 Laura Pedersen (born 1965) – American author, journalist, playwright and humorist. Books and plays with humanist themes. Lifelong UU, Interfaith minister. 
 Sarah Maria Clinton Perkins (1824-1905) – American Universalist minister, social reformer, lecturer, editor, author
 Melissa Harris-Perry (born 1973) – professor, author, and political commentator on MSNBC hosting the Melissa Harris-Perry TV program.
 William James Perry, (born 1927) – former United States Secretary of Defense
 William T. Pheiffer (1898–1986) – American lawyer/politician
 Utah Phillips, (1935–2008) – American singer, songwriter and homeless advocate
 William Pickering (1910–2004) – space explorer
 James Pierpont (1822–1893) – songwriter ("Jingle Bells")
 Daniel Pinkham (1923–2006) – composer
 John Platts (1775–1837) – English Unitarian minister and author
 Van Rensselaer Potter (1911–2001) – global bioethicist
 Joseph Priestley (1733–1804) – discoverer of oxygen and Unitarian minister
 George Pullman (1831–1897) – Universalist
 Sylvia Plath (1932–1963) – American writer, poet
 Beatrix Potter (1866–1943) – British children's writer of the famous "Peter Rabbit" stories

R
 Mary Jane Rathbun (1860–1943) – marine zoologist
 James Reeb (1927–1965) – civil-rights martyr
 Curtis W. Reese (1887–1961) – religious humanist
 Christopher Reeve (1952–2004) – actor and Unitarian Universalist
 James Relly (c. 1722–1778) – Universalist
 Paul Revere (1735–1818) – American silversmith, industrialist and patriot
 David Ricardo (1772–1823) – British classical economist noted for creating the concept of comparative advantage
 Malvina Reynolds (1900–1978) – songwriter / singer / activist
 Mark Ritchie (born 1951) – Minnesota Secretary of State (2007–)
 Hugh Ronalds (1760-1833) – British horticulturalist and nurseryman
 Francis Ronalds (1788-1873) – English inventor of the electric telegraph
 Benjamin Rush (1745–1813) – very active in the Universalist movement, although never technically joined a Universalist congregation

S
 Mary Augusta Safford (1851–1927) – Unitarian Minister and leader of the Iowa Sisterhood.
 Leverett Saltonstall (1892–1979) – U.S. Senator from Massachusetts
 Franklin Benjamin Sanborn (1831–1917) – one of the Secret Six who funded John Brown's raid on Harper's Ferry; social scientist and memorialist of transcendentalism.
 May Sarton (1912–1995) – poet
 Ellery Schempp (born 1940) – physicist who was the primary student involved in the landmark 1963 United States Supreme Court case of Abington School District v. Schempp, which declared that public school-sanctioned Bible readings were unconstitutional.
 Arthur Schlesinger (1917–2007) – American historian
 Richard Schultes (1915–2001) – explorer of the Amazon jungle
 William F. Schulz (born 1949) – former executive director of Amnesty International USA, former president of the Unitarian Universalist Association
 Ferdinand Schumacher (1822–1908) – one of the founders of companies which merged to become the Quaker Oats Company.
 Albert Schweitzer (1875–1965) – Nobel Peace Laureate 1953, late in life unitarian; honorary member of the Church of the Larger Fellowship (Unitarian Friend)
 Pete Seeger (1919–2014) – folk singer and song writer
 Roy Wood Sellars (1880–1973) – philosopher of religious humanism
 Rod Serling (1924–1975) – writer; creator of The Twilight Zone television series.
 Martha Sharp (1905-1999) – an American Unitarian who was named by the Yad Vashem organization as "Righteous Among the Nations."
 Waitstill Sharp (1902-1983) – a Unitarian minister who along with his wife Martha were named by Yad Vashem as "Righteous Among the Nations."
 Lemuel Shaw (1781–1861) – Unitarian and chief justice of the Massachusetts Supreme Judicial Court. Under his leadership, the court convicted Abner Kneeland, a former Universalist, of blasphemy.
 Robert Gould Shaw (1837–1863) – colonel of the 54th Massachusetts, first regiment of free blacks in the Union Army.
 Herbert A. Simon (1916–2001) – Nobel Laureate in Economics 1978, artificial intelligence pioneer
 Rev. William G. Sinkford (born 1946) – seventh president of the Unitarian Universalist Association
 Fred Small (born 1952) - Singer-songwriter and UU minister. 
 Caroline Soule (1824–1903) – American writer, ordained Universalist minister, first woman ordained as a minister in the UK in 1880
 Vanessa Southern, minister of the Unitarian Church in Summit
 Catherine Helen Spence (1825–1910) – Australian suffragette and political reformer
Lysander Spooner (1808-1887) – American abolitionist and anarchist.
 Elizabeth Cady Stanton (1815–1902) – American suffragist, abolitionist, and leading figure of the early women's rights movement
 Pete Stark (1931–2020) – U.S. Representative, D-California.
 Vilhjalmur Stefansson (1879–1962) – Arctic explorer and champion of Native American rights
 Charles Proteus Steinmetz (1865–1923) – Prussian-American electrical engineer and mathematician
 Adlai Stevenson (1900–1965) – Illinois governor, and Democratic presidential candidate in 1952 and 1956
 George D. Stoddard (1897 – 1981) - president of University of Illinois and the University of the State of New York.
 Lucy Stone (1818—1893) American orator, abolitionist, and suffragist
 Joseph Story (1779–1845) – United States Supreme Court Justice from 1811 to 1845.
 Dirk Jan Struik (1894–2000) – mathematician
 Jedediah Strutt (1726-1797) – pioneer cotton spinner and philanthropic employer.
 Margaret Sutton (1903–2001) – author of the Judy Bolton series and other children's books
Jude Sylvan (b. 1982) American poet, author, performer, producer, and performing artist and UU minister.

T
 William Howard Taft (1857–1930) – President of the United States (1909-1913) and Chief Justice of the United States
 Robin Tanner - American Unitarian Universalist Minister and advocate for LBGT rights and voting rights.
 Clementia Taylor (1810–1908) – women's activist and radical
 Joyce Tischler - Founder of Animal Legal Defense Fund, referred to as the "Mother of Animal Law."
 Clyde Tombaugh (1906–1997) – American astronomer who discovered Pluto
 Amos G. Throop (1811–1894) – Founder of Throop University, which later became the California Institute of Technology in Pasadena, where he was also the city's third mayor. Throop Unitarian Universalist Church in Pasadena, a Unitarian Universalist congregation founded in 1923, was named after him.

V
 William Vidler (1758–1816) – English Universalist and Unitarian minister
 Kurt Vonnegut (1922–2007) – writer

W
 George Wald (1906–1997) – Nobel Laureate in Medicine 1967
 Zach Wahls (born 1991) – LGBT activist, Iowa State Senator-elect
 Caroline Farrar Ware (1899–1990) – historian and social activist
 William D. Washburn (1831–1912) – Universalist American politician and businessman
 Daniel Webster (1782–1852)
 Dawud Wharnsby (born 1972) – poet, singer and songwriter (Unitarian Universalist and Muslim)
 Alfred Tredway White (1846–1921) – housing reformer and philanthropist
 Alfred North Whitehead (1861–1947) – philosopher (Unitarian Friend)
 Willis Rodney Whitney (1868–1958) – the "Father of Basic Research in Industry"
 Thomas Whittemore (1800–1861) – Universalist Minister, author and publisher
 David Rhys Williams (1890–1970) – American Unitarian minister
 Edward Williams (bardic name Iolo Morganwg) (1747–1826) – Welsh antiquarian, poet, collector, forger
 William Carlos Williams (1883–1963) – physician and author
 Samuel Williston (1861–1963) – dean of America's legal profession.
 Edwin H. Wilson (1898–1993) – Unitarian Humanist leader
 Ross Winans (1796–1877) – inventor and railroad pioneer
 Joanne Woodward (born 1930) – actress, wife of Paul Newman
 Theodore Paul Wright (1895–1970) – aeronautical engineer
 Frank Lloyd Wright (1867–1959) – among Wright's architectural works were Unity Temple in Oak Park, Illinois, and First Unitarian Society in Madison, Wisconsin.
 Quincy Wright (1890–1970) – author of A Study of War
 Richard Wright (1764–1836) – English Unitarian minister and missionary
 Sewall Wright (1889–1988) – evolutionary theorist.
 N. C. Wyeth (1882–1945) – illustrator and painter

Y
 Owen D. Young (1874–1962) – president and chairman of General Electric. Founder of Radio Corporation of America which helped found National Broadcasting Company. Drafted the Young Plan after World War I.
 Whitney M. Young (1921–1971) – social work administrator

Z
 John II Sigismund Zápolya (1540–1570) – king of Hungary, then prince of Transylvania.

See also

List of Christian Universalists
List of Unitarian, Universalist, and Unitarian Universalist churches
Lists of people by belief

Footnotes, citations and references

External links
 Dictionary of Unitarian and Universalist Biography
 Famous UUs

Unitarians, Universalists, and Unitarian Universalists
Christian universalists
List
List